Lobelia erinus (edging lobelia, garden lobelia or trailing lobelia) is a species of flowering plant in the bellflower family Campanulaceae, native to southern Africa.

Description
It is a low growing, prostrate or scrambling herbaceous perennial plant growing to 8–15 cm tall. The basal leaves are oval, 10 mm long and 4–8 mm broad, with a toothed margin; leaves higher on the stems are slender and sometimes untoothed. 

The flowers are blue to violet in wild plants, with a five-lobed corolla 8–20 mm across; they are produced in loose panicles. About 0.5 to 4.5 inches long inflorescence stems are about 5 inches long, loose racemose inflorescences with many flowers. The hermaphrodite flower is zygomorphic with a length of up to 1 centimeter and quinate with double perianth. The five sepals are fused. The fan-shaped lower lip is trilobed. The color of the crown varies depending on the variety between white, blue, purple,  pink or red and the center is yellow or white. The five stamens are 3 to 7 millimeters long.

The fruit is a 5–8 mm capsule containing numerous small seeds.

Range
The distribution area lies in southern Africa and extends from Malawi, Mozambique, Zambia and Zimbabwe to the south to Botswana, Namibia, Eswatini, Lesotho and the South African provinces.

Cultivation and uses
Lobelia erinus is a very popular edging plant in gardens, especially for hanging baskets and window boxes. In temperate zones it is grown as a half-hardy annual, i.e. sown under glass with some heat in spring, then planted out when all danger of frost has passed. Alternatively plants can be purchased from garden centres as young "plug" plants, to be transferred outside in May or June.

Cultivars
Numerous cultivars have been selected, either with a bushy or a trailing habit, in a wide range of flower colours, including white, pink, magenta ("red"), pale to dark blue, and purple, often with a prominent white eye. Some of the better known cultivars include 'Blue Moon', 'Gracilis', 'Crystal Palace', 'Sapphire', 'Rosamund' and 'Riviera Rose'.

In the United Kingdom the following cultivars have gained the Royal Horticultural Society's Award of Garden Merit:

'Cambridge Blue' 
Cascade Series
'Colour Cascade' 
'Crystal Palace'  
'Mrs Clibran' 
=‘Westpurstar’ 
'Regatta Midnight Blue' 
'Regatta Sky Blue' 
'Richardii' syn. Lobelia richardsonii 
'Riviera Blue Eyes' 
'String of Pearls'
=‘Lobstrahob’
=‘Balobwablu’ (Waterfall Series)

Gallery

References

erinus
Flora of Malawi
Flora of Namibia
Flora of South Africa
Annual plants
Garden plants of Southern Africa
Medicinal plants of Africa
Plants described in 1753
Taxa named by Carl Linnaeus